Christian W. Staudinger (born December 19, 1952 in Erfurt, East Germany) is a German artist who became involved in art after his escape from the GDR (short for "German Democratic Republic", the official name of East Germany) and the trial of a civil life. He is dedicated to the visual arts (sculpture and painting), performance and conceptual art, poetry and political arts, is a video artist and arranges installation art.

Life

Childhood in Waltershausen (1952–1968) 

Staudinger was the son of a hotel and restaurant manager, Gerhard Staudinger (b. April 20, 1923, in Erfurt, d. February 3, 1988, in Waltershausen), and his wife Edeltraut (b. January 30, 1927, in Wandersleben, d. December 11, 2011, in Waltershausen). He grew up in the village of Schmira near Erfurt and from 1956 in Waltershausen, where his parents ran the Bayerischer Hof restaurant, a member of the state-controlled Restaurant Trade Organisation (German: HO). In Schirma they ran the Hotel Welcome, a private, independent business, but in 1956, about the time when Christian's brother Ulrich was born, they moved to the state-controlled hotel in Waltershausen, as they had to give up their independent operators' license. Staudiger had a happy childhood although there were arguments with his parents about politics. His parents were still influenced by the politics of the Nazi era, and were extremely critical of the GDR. The national flag was not flown when it was required to be and his parents never voted in GDR elections, although these were both officially required duties in the GDR. However, members of the Stasi hierarchy visited his parents' restaurant because of the good food. Christian Staudinger was an enthusiastic communist, avidly read communist literature, and was a keen drummer in the local fanfare band in Waltershausen, guided by his teacher Otto Müller.

His paternal grandfather, Wilhelm Staudinger, was a German nationalist, who ran Hotel Welcome with his wife Paula, before his son took over. During the Nazi period he gave extra bread and milk to forced labourers. The village teacher betrayed him. He was arrested, tortured at Petersberg Citadel in Erfurt and died a few days later as result. Staudiger's maternal grandfather, Phillip Orth, worked for the Deutsche Reichsbahn and co-founded the Communist Party of Germany in Neudietendorf shortly after the First World War. To protect the family, he sent his daughter to the League of German Girls, a Nazi organisation. He was not bothered by the Nazis and died when Staudinger was 16 years old. His uncle, Sigmar Orth, was a liaison officer between the police and the Stasi, who encouraged Staudiger's interest in history and enthusiasm for the developing communist German state.

Youth and escape from East Germany (1968–1972) 
At age 16, Staudinger left home and went to Erfurt, where he began his apprenticeship as a waiter after his original career aspirations of being a sailor in the merchant navy and, thereafter, the boatman on inland waters had been rejected by the Stasi. People in the GDR needed a permit from the state for their career aspirations. In Erfurt he fell into circles around Eberhard Häfner and others. They had passionate discussions about politics and art, listened to the music of the so-called imperialist Staatsfeind and he came in contact with THC and LSD-25. He read Group Psychology and the Analysis of the Ego and Totem and Taboo by Sigmund Freud, which he had received from Eberhard Häfner. He tried to use these writings in his final examination paper—then viewed as an affront. His teacher, Mrs. Richter, expressed her enthusiasm privately but could not vote because literature of the "State-enemy" had been cited. The day after his practical test, from which he made a parody and therefore failed, Staudinger went to escape from East Germany. He wished to leave his beloved home, because emerging and fast growing doubts about the integrity of the system were growing in him. He had read the classics, but all that did not stand in comparison with reality. In addition, he wanted to become a skydiver. He was in the Gesellschaft für Sport und Technik, but in order to jump one had to be in the National People's Army or in the Stasi. The Stasi began to be interested in him and tried to recruit him as part of the OPK (operational checks on persons). He felt honoured and loved those discussions with the Stasi officers who at home always encountered violent counter-arguments. But soon the Stasi was tired, wanted names that he refused to provide, prompting the never-forgotten threat received by many former GDR-citizens: "Either you are with us or against us. Join in and out you can be something. If not, you will croak on the machine!"
 
At the age of 18, in 1971, Staudinger and a friend made their way to Bulgaria in order to leave the country to travel to Turkey. This was the route many so-called "Republic-refugees" had chosen, as Stefan Appelius, a professor of Political Science, has researched. Only his brother was informed he was leaving so as not to endanger the family. At the Veleka river they failed to escape because the maps were wrong. They were arrested and tortured and put in a Bulgarian prison. But Staudinger lived, unlike other refugees. The Stasi in Bulgaria brought him back to East Germany, and he was put into the Stasi prison, Andreasstrasse, in Erfurt and sentenced to one year and seven months for his attempt at illegal emigration and fomenting anti-state-propaganda, which he served in Cottbus. With the help of the two lawyers Vogel & Stange (one east, one west, and in that time famous in Germany) he came straight from prison to the Federal Republic of Germany (better known at the time as "West Germany", when German reunification happened in 1990, the government of West Germany took control of East Germany became the government of reunified Germany and still uses "Federal Republic of Germany" as its official name). By a tragic event, unlike many others in the GDR convicted for political offenses, came into possession of copies of the indictment and judgment. The experiences of the flight are published in German as an audio book on YouTube, spoken by Erich Räuker. Shortly before his flight Staudinger had fathered a child, which he learned about in prison after the child was born. He managed to bring the mother and child using of family reunification to West Berlin. The West and the events of the recent past destroyed everything he had believed, so that he tried to kill himself in 1974 with 250 sleeping pills. The doctors succeeded in saving him from being clinically dead. His brother, Ulrich, later was sentenced to 4 years for reportedly subversive propaganda. Released earlier he jumped to jumped to his death in a West Berlin subway in 1981.

Adult in Berlin (since 1972) 
Having found accommodation in the Evangelisches Johannesstift Berlin (in what was then West Berlin, the part of the divided city controlled by West Germany, upon German reunification in 1990, West Berlin merged with its counterpart East Berlin (the capital city of East Germany) to become reunified Berlin which then became the capital city of reunified Germany immediately after the event), Pastor Helmut Gwiasda took him under his wing. He let Staudinger complete the diaconal basic course, but it drove him on. He went to high school and then studied social pedagogy and philosophy. His own prison experience influenced him professionally and between 1981–1986 he worked in the women's prison in Berlin as a group leader with drug-addicted adult women. Severe migraine attacks forced him to give up. He then moved to the creative arts. His efforts to become member of the Professional Association of Visual Artists in Berlin (BBK) failed—he was rejected because he did not want to be confined to the visual arts. He responded with a public debate in the former Open Channel Berlin, known today as AlexTV. The connection between art and sport is important to Staudinger. In 1977 he went to Texel (Netherlands) and completed his training as a parachutist and 1992 in DeLand, Florida as a jumpmaster.

Artistic career 

The first abstract paintings were created when he was no more than ten years old—he called them children's work. Three representational paintings from this period with the titles The LPG, Klaustor and Moon landing were exhibited at a school in Waltershausen but never returned, and have been lost since the change 1989/90. Russian drawing teacher Thiem promoted his artistic talent and looked after the missing talent for foreign languages. His father, who was an enthusiastic amateur photographer, introduced him to photography and filming. He used Super 8 film and recorded Staudinger's childhood which is well documented. Staudinger sold his first pictures at school and accumulated in pocket money, managed by his mother. He burned some of it in the context of his first performance outside the Theater of Friendship in Waltershausen. In his school the artist was in the Committee Film in the Theater of Friendship from the fifth to the tenth grade. In 1968 he wrote his first poems. The illegal West TV in his parents home introduced Staudinger to Joseph Beuys and he read the GDR banned authors like Erich Fromm, Sigmund Freud, Laozi, Nietzsche, C.G. Jung and others.

In 1980 he moved to his first tiny painting studio in Berlin (in the part of the city that was known as "West Berlin" at the time). He worked initially as self-taught, and was again, as in his childhood, a bookworm. In 1981, shortly after the beginning of his work in the prison, at the former Landesbildstelle Berlin he took a video course and applied thereafter for the first time at the German Film and Television Academy Berlin (dffb). His application was unsuccessful. In 1983 he founded the publishing company Zwielicht and published his two volumes of poetry Zustände eines Grenzverletzers and Über mir bin Es. In the same year he first took part (and from then on every year) in the Free Berlin Art Exhibition (in German FBK) under the leadership of Ernst Leonhardt.  He was member of the group of artists known as Blindflug which was led by Norbert Wirth. Later he joined the FBK as an individual artist.

In 1986 his main occupation as an artist began and with his participation in the Open Channel Berlin–today AlexTV. In the following eight years, there have been numerous artistic projects, first performances and the development of conceptual art. Some videos were posted on the Hamburg short-film-festival, while others were presented at the Tokyo International Film Festival, including Die Mutter, Revolution and Heimat. In 1994, Staudinger took part in the Artistic Competition Memorial to the Murdered Jews of Europe and started at the Free Art School in Berlin to study screen printing and sculpture, which he later continued with Peter Rosenzweig in Campo dell'Altissimo. In 2005 he stood as a witness for injustice in the GDR at  Erfurt of Hildigund Neubert. This led to an artistic action in his former cell in the Andreasstrasse Stasi prison in Erfurt. In the meantime he moved twice with his painting-studio to larger ones, and two sculptor-studios in Berlin and Waltershausen were established. In 2007 he presented to the public the results of his 10-year work on Nazism and Adolf Hitler under the title Adolf Hitler 007 He was under police protection, but except for a small event announcement, coverage by the media wasmuted. In 2008, his dispute with the second German dictatorship in the GDR began under the title Prison & Torture in Bulgaria and the GDR. Two exhibitions were the outcome in 2014 in Erfurt, one in the former prison and one in Speicher in Erfurt. There are plans for an ArtHouse Waltershausen in the house of his parents in Thuringia.

Artistic works 

Staudinger's artistic work includes paintings in different styles, formats and techniques, drawings, collages, etchings, crayon, silkscreen, watercolors and BookArt—i.e. drawings that are created when reading in books and influenced by what is read. There are also sculptures, statuettes and applied art, as well as installation art and assemblages. A large room holds the political art using their confrontation with the two German dictatorships. There is an extensive archive with conceptual art and some is in a field—Land art—under the title Stones of the Earth. The work includes natural and artificial photos, as well as poetry and postcards. Video works often accompanies other artistic projects by Staudinger and documents them or is shown with accompanying performances. The covers for DVDs are designed and manufactured by hand. Lately they are, often greatly reduced, posted on his YouTube channel.

Releases

Books 

 Über mir bin Es. Gedichte, Zeichnungen, Fotos, Collagen. Zwielicht-Verlag Berlin 1989 
 Zustände eines Grenzverletzers. Gedichte und Zeichnungen. Zwielicht-Verlag Berlin 1983

Filmography 

All short videos up to 2011 were published in full-length (40–120 min.) in the Open Channel Berlin (OKB, today AlexTV).
Cutouts:

Exhibitions 
Cutouts:
 1964: Polytechnische Oberschule Waltershausen/GDR, group-exhibition
 1983–1995: Freie Berliner Kunstausstellung – annual participation
 1986: Offener Kanal Berlin/AlexTV – ongoing publishing of art-videos
 1987: Galerie Goltzstr. 32, Berlin
 1987: Die Anweisung
 1989: Kunsthaus Lütjenwestedt, Schleswig-Holstein
 1991: Gesinnungstat Kunst, Mediathek Köpenick
 1995: Denkmal für die ermordeten Juden Europas, Berlin
 1996: KunstKaos in Köpenick
 1998: Erdensteine, Sinai – ongoing public exhibition
 1999: Abstraktionen, Museum für Leben & Kunst, Berlin
 2001: Camera obscura, Wuhlheide Berlin
 2002: Köpfe & Abstraktionen, Edenhaus am Europacenter, Berlin
 2007: Adolf Hitler 007 – Unerträgliches ertragen , Berlin
 2014: so nah...weit fern – group-exhibition in Erfurt

Performances 

Cutouts:
 1988: Die Mauer muss weg
 1988: Hommage an Joseph Beuys
 1991: Kunstaktion IFA91
 1994: Das Bild sind Sie selbst
 1997: Hommage an die Christo's
 1997: Soma
 2013: MACHT BANK KUNST ???

References

External links 

 Website of the artist
 Literature by Christian W. Staudinger in the German National Library

German contemporary artists
Postmodern artists
Modern painters
German surrealist artists
20th-century German painters
German male painters
20th-century German sculptors
20th-century German male artists
German male sculptors
Living people
Artists from Berlin
1952 births